Helen Riehle is an American politician from the state of Vermont who served as a U.S. Republican Party member of the Vermont Senate, representing all of Chittenden County except for the town of Colchester. She is chair of the South Burlington City Council and resides in that city. Having previously served in both the State House and Senate, she was appointed by Governor Peter Shumlin in March 2016 to succeed Diane Snelling, who had earlier resigned.

References

1950 births
Living people
Republican Party members of the Vermont House of Representatives
Politicians from Somerville, New Jersey
People from South Burlington, Vermont
University of Vermont alumni
Republican Party Vermont state senators
21st-century American women politicians
Schoolteachers from Vermont
20th-century American women politicians
Women state legislators in Vermont
20th-century American politicians
21st-century American politicians
Vermont city council members
20th-century American women educators
20th-century American educators